Edward Richard Steere (March 2, 1927 – May 3, 2021) was an American football guard who played for the Philadelphia Eagles and Edmonton Eskimos. He played college football at Drake University, having previously attended Thornton Township High School in Harvey, Illinois.

He died on May 3, 2021, at the age of 94.

References

1927 births
2021 deaths
American football guards
Canadian football guards
American players of Canadian football
Drake Bulldogs football players
Philadelphia Eagles players
Edmonton Elks players
Players of American football from Chicago
Players of Canadian football from Chicago